The Tribe is a 2018 Spanish comedy film directed by Fernando Colomo and written by Fernando Colomo and Yolanda García Serrano. The film is a MOD Producciones and Atresmedia Cine production, and it had the participation of Movistar+.

Premise
The Tribe revolves around how the human resources director of a massive corporation, Fidel García Ruiz (Paco León), becomes a viral sensation when he and an underling are caught on video having sex in his office. The video of the two of them being wheeled out of the office circulates, and becomes the basis of a mega-popular dance hit.

Cast

Release
Distributed by Hispano Foxfilm, The Tribe was theatrically released on March 16, 2018 in Spain.

See also 
 List of Spanish films of 2018

References

External links 
 
 

2018 films
2018 comedy films
Spanish comedy films
2010s Spanish-language films
MOD Producciones films
Atresmedia Cine films
2010s Spanish films
Films directed by Fernando Colomo